Andrea Seccafien (born August 27, 1990, in Guelph, Ontario) is a Canadian long-distance runner, who mostly competes in the 5000 m event.

In 2010, Seccafien enrolled to the Samford University in the United States. After two years, she transferred to the University of Guelph in Canada to study economics and political sciences. In 2013, she won the national 5000 m title at the Canadian Championships. She missed the 2015 season due to a foot injury. In May 2016, she ran a personal best of 15:17.81 and qualified for the 2016 Olympics. In July 2016, she was officially named to the Canadian Olympic team.

She represented Canada at the 2020 Summer Olympics. In 2021, Seccafien beat the Canadian record for 10,000 m at the Sound Running Track Meet with a time of 31:13.94. She finished 15th in the Athletics at the 2020 Summer Olympics – Women's 5000 metres.

References

External links
 
 
 EP 145. Andrea Seccafien 28 January 2023 Women Run Canada podcast

1990 births
Living people
Canadian female long-distance runners
Sportspeople from Guelph
Athletes (track and field) at the 2016 Summer Olympics
Olympic track and field athletes of Canada
Canadian Track and Field Championships winners
Athletes (track and field) at the 2020 Summer Olympics